Newton High School is a public high school in Newton, Kansas, United States operated by Newton USD 373 school district, and serves students of grades 9 to 12.  It is located on a  campus with a Cedar-tree surrounded parking lot.

History
Newton High School was founded in 1885. Historically, Newton High School has been located at three different locations:
 first school was located at the northwest corner of 6th and Ash (currently Lincoln Park Apartments) and built in TBD,
 second school was located at the northeast corner of Broadway and Poplar (currently Santa Fe 5/6 Center school) and built in 1914,
 third (current) school is located at the northeast corner of 12th and Boyd (in northwest Newton) and built in the early 1970s.

As a result of a bond election that took place in 2007, renovation construction began on the school in 2009 and was completed in 2010. The renovation added several sections to the school and redistributed the rooms within the building; in this redistribution, safety and modernization were both heavy concerns. Aside from significantly changing the exterior of the school, the renovations also pushed the administration offices forward and relocated the school library.

Extracurricular activities

Athletics
Students from grades 9-12 participate in football, volleyball, cross country, tennis, girls and boys basketball, wrestling, gymnastics, bowling, swimming, girls and boys soccer, baseball, softball, boys and girls golf, track and field and bowling. Activities available include cheerleading, Railiners Dance Team, Azteca Dancers, debate, forensics, FFA, GSA, KFC, BPA, Drama, Music (Vocal, Band, Jazz Band, Pep Band, Orchestra), Science Olympiad, Model UN, and FIRST Robotics Competition Team.

State Championships

Notable people
Faculty
 Mike Moore, former head football coach at Bethel College, assistant head coach and defensive coordinator at Newton High School
Alumni
 Reed Crandall (1917-1982), illustrator and penciller of comic books and magazines, inducted into Will Eisner Comic Book Hall of Fame in 2009
 Jayne Hrdlicka (c. 1963-), business executive; President and Chair of Tennis Australia and CEO of Virgin Australia Holdings
 Miles Johns (1994-), Mixed martial artist currently competing in the UFC bantamweight division
 Muadianvita Kazadi (1973-), former linebacker for St. Louis Rams in 1997 and Montreal Alouettes in 1999
 Dustin Richardson (1984-), former MLB player (Boston Red Sox)

Attended
 Errett Bishop (1928-1983), mathematician, college professor
 Orville Harrold (1877-1933), operatic tenor and musical theatre actor

See also
 Fischer Field Stadium
 List of high schools in Kansas
 List of unified school districts in Kansas

References

External links
 Official website
 USD 373, school district for Newton, North Newton, Walton
 Railer Runners
 The Newtonian, school newspaper, archive of website from 2009 to 2013
 USD 373 School District Boundary Map, KDOT

Public high schools in Kansas
Schools in Harvey County, Kansas
Educational institutions established in 1885
1885 establishments in Kansas